In UK politics, the Parliamentary Labour Party (PLP) is the parliamentary group of the Labour Party in Parliament, i.e. Labour MPs as a collective body. Commentators on the British Constitution sometimes draw a distinction between the Labour Party (which was created outside Parliament and later achieved office) and the Conservative and Liberal parties (which began as parliamentary factions). The term Parliamentary Labour Party refers to the party in Parliament, whereas the term Labour Party refers to the entire Labour Party, the parliamentary element of which is the PLP.

A similar body for the Conservative Party is the 1922 Committee.

An organisation for former members, the PLP in exile, was established after the 2010 general election.

Role
The PLP holds regular meetings behind closed doors to question the Leader and to discuss its concerns.

Labour MPs elect three of their number to Labour's National Executive Committee.

Originally, the Leader of the Labour Party was elected by the PLP.  Now, however, the party operates on a one member, one vote system, where all members are awarded a single vote, as well as affiliated organizations (trade unions and socialist societies) and temporary registered supporters. Instant-runoff voting (the "Alternative Vote") is used to conduct the election. Labour MPs retain the power to trigger an extraordinary or "special" Labour Party Conference to choose a new leader if they lose confidence in their existing leader.

Chair

The Chair of the PLP chairs meetings of the Parliamentary party. They are elected by Labour MPs at the start of each annual session of Parliament. By tradition, only elections at the start of each Parliament, following a general election, are competitive.

From 1921 to 1970, the Chair of the PLP was also the leader of the party as a whole (before 1921, leadership of the party was arguably split between the Chairman of the PLP, the General Secretary and the Party Chairman). When the leaders of the Labour Party joined coalition governments during the First and Second World Wars, an acting chair was appointed to lead the rump of the party in Opposition. When the Party was in government, a liaison committee was elected to facilitate communications between the cabinet and Labour backbenchers – the chair of this committee also chaired meetings of the PLP as a whole during these periods. In 1970, the positions of Leader of the Labour Party and Chair of the PLP were permanently split.

 Keir Hardie (1906–1908)
 Arthur Henderson (1908–1910)
 George Barnes (1910–11)
 Ramsay MacDonald (1911–1914)
 Arthur Henderson (1914–1917)
 John Hodge (1915–16) – in opposition
 George Wardle (1916–17) – in opposition
 William Adamson (1917–1921)
 J. R. Clynes (1921–22)
 Ramsay MacDonald (1922–1931)
 Robert Smillie (1924) – Liaison Committee
 Harry Snell (1929–30) – Liaison Committee
 James Barr (1930–31) – Liaison Committee
 Arthur Henderson (1931)
 George Lansbury (1931–1935)
 Clement Attlee (1935–1955)
 Hastings Lees-Smith (1940–1942) – in opposition
 Frederick Pethick-Lawrence (1942) – in opposition
 Arthur Greenwood (1942–1945) – in opposition
 Neil Maclean (1945–46) – Liaison Committee
 Maurice Webb (1946–1950) – Liaison Committee
 Glenvil Hall (1950–51) – Liaison Committee
 Hugh Gaitskell (1955–1963)
 Harold Wilson (1963–1970)
 Emanuel Shinwell (1964–1967) – Liaison Committee
 Douglas Houghton (1967–1970) – Liaison Committee
 Douglas Houghton (1970–1974)
 Ian Mikardo (1974)
 Cledwyn Hughes (1974–1979)
 Fred Willey (1979–1981)
 Jack Dormand (1981–1987)
 Stanley Orme (1987–1992)
 Doug Hoyle (1992–1997)
 Clive Soley (1997–2001)
 Jean Corston (2001–2005)
 Ann Clwyd (2005–2006)
 Tony Lloyd (2006–2012)
 David Watts (2012–2015)
 John Cryer (2015–present)

Other roles and groups
There is also a deputy chair.

Other groups have been established within the PLP, such as the Women's PLP and the LGBT+ PLP.

See also
Conservative Private Members' Committee
Parliamentary group

References

Organisation of the Labour Party (UK)
Parliament of the United Kingdom